Mittelsachsen ("Central Saxony") is a district (Kreis) in the Free State of Saxony, Germany.

History 
The district was established by merging the former districts of Döbeln, Freiberg and Mittweida as part of the district reform of August 2008.

Geography 
The district stretches from the Erzgebirge ("Ore Mountains") on the Czech Republic–Germany border to the plains between Leipzig and Dresden. The district borders (from the west and clockwise) the state Thuringia, the districts of Leipzig, Nordsachsen, Meißen, Sächsische Schweiz-Osterzgebirge, the Czech Republic, Erzgebirgskreis, the urban district Chemnitz, and the district of Zwickau.

The geography of the district varies considerably, stretching from the northern part which almost reaches the North German Plain, to the southern part in the mountainous Erzgebirge region. The lowest point is at 140 metres above sea level, in the valley of the Freiberger Mulde near Leisnig. The highest point is 855 metres above sea level on the Czech border.

The most important rivers in Mittelsachsen are the Zwickauer and Freiberger Mulde, and the Zschopau river. Other notable rivers include Bobritzsch, Striegis, Gimmlitz and Flöha. The district also contains the reservoirs Kriebstein, Lichtenberg and Rauschenbach. Part of the Erzgebirge/Vogtland national park is located in the southern part of Mittelsachsen.

Politics

Coat of arms 
In 2008, upon the creation of the Mittelsachsen district, the heraldic society "Schwarzer Löwe" in Leipzig, in collaboration with graphics studio Eberhard Heinicker, put forward several proposals for a new coat of arms. Six proposals in total were put to the district council. The district council eventually chose the current design on 10 June 2009. The coat of arms shows the lion of Meißen, representing the Margravate of Meissen, and a hammer and pick representing the local mining heritage. The blue waves are derived from the coat of arms of Mittweida, and the three black lozenges from the former arms of Döbeln.

District council 
The elections for the Mittelsachsen district happened on 7 June 2015. The former mayor of Mittweida, Matthias Damm (CDU), won with an absolute majority (65.74% of votes).

Transport

Road 
The district is crossed by three Autobahns: A4, A14, and A72. Several Bundesstraßen (federal highways) also cross through Mittelsachsen, including the 101 (Berlin to Aue) and 7 (Düsseldorf to Chemnitz).

Rail 
Several railways cross through the Mittelsachsen district, most notably the Dresden–Werdau railway servicing Freiberg and Flöha, among others. There are no long distance railway connections in Mittelsachsen, but such connections are easily reachable by taking regional trains to Dresden, Chemnitz or Leipzig. Freiberg is included in the Dresden S-Bahn network. The entire district is served by the Verkehrsbund Mittelsachsen.

Flight 
The closest airports for commercial travel are Leipzig–Altenburg Airport (15 km), Dresden Airport (28 km), and Leipzig/Halle Airport (58 km). However, there is an airfield at Langhennersdorf which is used for recreational flight.

Academic Education 
The Landkreis is home to two universities, the TU Bergakademie in Freiberg (focused on Geo-science) and the University of Applied Sciences in Mittweida (MINT, Social, Media).

Towns and municipalities 

{|
|-
!  style="text-align:left; width:33%;"|Towns
! colspan="2"  style="text-align:left; width:67%;"|Municipalities
|- valign=top
||
Augustusburg
Brand-Erbisdorf
Burgstädt
Döbeln
Flöha
Frankenberg
Frauenstein
Freiberg
Geringswalde
Großschirma
Hainichen
Hartha
Leisnig
Lunzenau
Mittweida
Oederan
Penig
Rochlitz
Roßwein
Sayda
Waldheim
||
Altmittweida
Bobritzsch-Hilbersdorf
Claußnitz
Dorfchemnitz
Eppendorf
Erlau
Großhartmannsdorf
Großweitzschen
Halsbrücke
Hartmannsdorf
Jahnatal
Königsfeld
Königshain-Wiederau
Kriebstein
Leubsdorf
Lichtenau
||
Lichtenberg
Mühlau
Mulda
Neuhausen
Niederwiesa
Oberschöna
Rechenberg-Bienenmühle
Reinsberg
Rossau
Seelitz
Striegistal
Taura
Wechselburg
Weißenborn
Zettlitz
|}

References

External links 

  (German)